Oscar Birgersson (born 8 April 2000) is a Swedish professional ice hockey player. He currently plays for Brynäs IF of the Swedish Hockey League (SHL).  His youth team was Hofors HC.

Career statistics

References

External links

2000 births
Living people
Almtuna IS players
Brynäs IF players
Swedish ice hockey centres